The 2023 FIBA Basketball World Cup qualification for the FIBA Europe region, began in February 2020 and concluded in February 2023. The process determined the twelve teams that would qualify for the 2023 FIBA Basketball World Cup.

On 9 December 2019, the World Anti-Doping Agency initially handed Russia a four-year ban from all major sporting events, after RUSADA was found non-compliant for handing over manipulating lab data and lying to investigators. WADA prohibited the use of the Russian flag and anthem at major international sporting events. However, the Russia national team could still enter qualification, as the ban only applied to the final tournament to decide the world champions. Russia appealed the ruling to the Court of Arbitration for Sport (CAS), which ruled in favour of WADA on 17 December 2020, but cut the ban from four to two years. Had Russia qualified, its players would have been able to use its name, flag and anthem at the World Cup, as a result of the nation's two-year ban expiring on 16 December 2022. However, Russia was later expelled from the tournament due to its invasion of Ukraine in February 2022.

Format
FIBA Europe was allocated 12 berths at the World Cup. In total, 39 FIBA Europe teams took part in the qualification tournament. The qualification consisted of the following stages:
 Pre-Qualifiers
 First round: Eight teams that did not advance to the EuroBasket 2022 qualifiers took part.
 Second round: The four teams were joined by the eight teams that were eliminated from the EuroBasket 2022 qualifiers. Teams that advanced from the previous round were assigned to Pot 3, while teams eliminated from EuroBasket 2022 qualifiers were assigned to Pots 1 or 2, according to FIBA rankings. Austria withdrew before the round and was replaced by Luxembourg. 
 Qualifiers
 First round: 24 teams that qualified for EuroBasket 2022 and eight teams that advanced from Pre-Qualifiers were organized into eight groups of four. The top three teams of each group qualified for the second round.
 Second round: The top 24 teams from the first round were organised into four groups of six, with results carried over from the first round. The top three teams of each group qualified for the World Cup.

Pre-qualifiers

Teams that did not advance to the EuroBasket 2022 qualifiers took part in the pre-qualifiers round.

First round

Group A

Group B

Second round

Group C

Group D

Group E

Group F

Qualifiers

First round

Group A

Group B

Group C

Group D

Group E

Group F

Group G

Group H

Second round

Group I

Group J

Group K

Group L

Statistical leaders

Player averages
As of August 29, 2022

Team averages

References

External links
Official website
Tournament summary

qualification
FIBA
Basketball competitions in Europe between national teams
Sports events affected by the 2022 Russian invasion of Ukraine
2021–22 in European basketball
2022–23 in European basketball